The Sabinetown Bluff Formation is a geologic formation in Texas. It preserves fossils dating back to the Paleogene period.

See also

 List of fossiliferous stratigraphic units in Texas
 Paleontology in Texas

References
 

Paleogene geology of Texas
Ypresian Stage
Wasatchian